"Nature Boy" is a song written by Eden Ahbez and later popularised by Nat King Cole, in 1948. 

Nature Boy may also refer to:

Arts, entertainment, and media

Fictional characters
 Nature Boy (comics), the title of a short-lived Charlton Comics superhero of the 1950s
 "Nature Boy", a character from the 1950 Bugs Bunny cartoon Bushy Hare
 "Ravishing Ronald The De-Natured Boy", a character from the 1951 Bugs Bunny cartoon Bunny Hugged

Music

Albums
 Nature Boy, a 2000 album by Jackie McLean
 Nature Boy: The Standards Album, a 2003 album by Aaron Neville

Songs
 "Nature Boy", a song by Nick Cave and the Bad Seeds from their album Abattoir Blues / The Lyre of Orpheus 
 "Nature Boy", a song by Primus from their album Pork Soda

Other arts, entertainment, and media
 Nature Boy, a 2000 Canadian television movie directed by Kari Skogland, in which Callum Keith Rennie portrayed Eden Ahbez
 Nature Boy, a 2000 BBC television drama series directed by Joe Wright

Social movement
 Nature boys or Naturemensch, a proto-hippie movement in California

Wrestling

Mascot
 Nature Boy, a human male mascot who appeared on the Gorgeous Ladies of Wrestling

Wrestlers
 Ric Flair (b. 1949), an American professional wrestler
 Buddy Landel (1961–2015), an American professional wrestler
 Buddy Rogers (wrestler) (1921–1992), an American professional wrestler
 Scoot Andrews (b. 1971), an American indy wrestler best known as "The Black Nature Boy" Scoot Andrews